The Flagship National Universities (Korea NU 10, Hanja: 據點國立大學校, literally: national universities designed as provincial centres) is a collective term referring to ten universities in South Korea that have joined the "Presidential Council of the Korean Flagship National Universities".

Universities 
The 10 Korean Flagship National Universities consist of:
 Chonnam National University, founded 1952 in Gwangju for the area of Gwangju and South Jeolla Province
 Chungbuk National University, founded 1951 in Cheongju for the area of North Chungcheong Province
 Chungnam National University, founded 1952 in Daejeon for the area of Daejeon and South Chungcheong Province and since 2007 also Sejong City
 Gyeongsang National University, founded 1910 in Jinju for the area of South Gyeongsang Province and Ulsan
 Jeju National University, founded 1952 in Jeju City for the area of Jeju Province
 Jeonbuk National University, founded 1947 in Jeonju for the area of North Jeolla Province
 Kangwon National University, founded 1947 in Chuncheon for the area of Gangwon Province
 Pusan National University, founded 1946 in Busan for the area of Busan and South Gyeongsang Province
 Kyungpook National University, founded 1946 in Daegu for the area of Daegu and North Gyeongsang Province
 Seoul National University, founded 1946 in Seoul for the area of Seoul.

History 
In the past, the term of Korean flagship National university was just used as a local national university because until 1991, there were only 10 national universities. "The Presidential Council of the Korean Flagship National Universities" was originally established in 1996 as the "Council of Five National Universities". It consisted of Kyungpook National University, Pusan National University, Chonnam National University, Jeonbuk National University, and Chungnam National University. Kangwon National University, Gyeongsang National University, Seoul National University, Jeju National University, and Chungbuk National University later joined.

Characteristics 
Most of Korean flagship National universities were created by merging previously existing regional colleges. After National Liberation, national universities in the central areas of capital, metropolitan cities and provinces have joined. Compared to other universities, Flagship National University tends to have departments that produce the professions needed by the local community. Because Flagship National Universities are generally the oldest schools within a region, they are often the largest, well-financed, low tuition, and are preferred by students compared to local private universities.

Medical schools 
All ten Korean Flagship National Universities are in possession of medical schools. Seoul National University has the largest medical school in South Korea (entrance quota: 135), followed by Pusan National University (125), Chonnam National University (125) and Chungnam National University (110). Among the 10 largest medical schools in South Korea, 6 medical schools belong to Korean Flagship National Universities.

Pusan National University has the one and only graduate school of oriental medicine in South Korea.

Traditional Korean medical schools 
Among all traditional Korean medical schools, Pusan National University is only one flagship Korean national university which has traditional Korean medical school with the name of "The School of Korean Medicine". Entrance quota of PNU's is 50 (25 for 7-year educational curriculum of undergraduate-postgraduate students, 25 for postgraduate students only).

Dental schools 
Among eleven schools of dental medicine in South Korea, five schools belong to Korean Flagship National Universities. Seoul National University has the largest school of dental medicine in South Korea, followed by Pusan National University.

Veterinary schools 
All Korean Flagship National Universities except Pusan National University have Veterinary schools.

Among the 10 veterinary schools in South Korea, 9 veterinary schools belong to Korean Flagship National Universities.

One Veterinary school that doesn't belong to Korean Flagship National Universities is Konkuk University. Konkuk University is the only Private University that has Veterinary school in South Korea.

Law schools 
All Korean Flagship National Universities except Gyeongsang National University have law schools. Seoul National University has the largest law school in South Korea.

Among the 25 law schools in South Korea, 9 law schools belong to Korean Flagship National Universities.

Collaborations 
Flagship National University has an exchange agreement with each other. Exchange students can go to regular and seasonal semesters, and online credit exchange is also possible. A sports competition is also held every year. It also publishes the flagship National University newsletter.